The Mowag Piranha is a family of armoured fighting vehicles designed by the Swiss company Mowag (since 2010 General Dynamics European Land Systems – Mowag GmbH).

Five generations of vehicles have been produced, manufactured by Mowag or under licence by other companies (notably the LAV), and variants are in service with military forces throughout the world.

Variants
Piranhas are available in 4×4, 6×6, 8×8, and 10×10 wheel versions. There are several variants within these versions, giving different degrees of armour protection and several kinds of turret, for use in a variety of roles. Piranha derivatives have been assigned roles as troop transports, command vehicles, fire support vehicles, tank trainers, and police vehicles.

Piranhas are used by the Swiss Army. Swiss-built Piranha derivatives have been exported to Ireland, Romania, Spain, and Belgium. The Romanian and Belgian armies have selected the Piranha IIIC 8×8. Belgium converted to an all-wheeled force, and replaced all their M113s, AIFVs and Leopard 1s with 268 Piranha IIIC in 7 variants.

Piranha derivatives have been manufactured under license by General Dynamics (Canada), BAE Systems Land Systems (UK), Cardoen and FAMAE (Chile), and in the USA.

A new Piranha V version, weighing in between 25 and 30 tons, was announced as the provisional winner of the British Army's FRES program on 8 May 2008, but this selection was reversed seven months later and bidding started again.

General Dynamics European Land Systems launched their new Piranha Class 5 at EUROSATORY 2010 on 15 June and it was reported that the British MoD were showing renewed interest, but struggling with budget constraints.

MOWAG Piranha 4×4 IB

The MOWAG Piranha 4×4 IB was an armored personnel carrier.

To complete the Piranha I Family of 1974, the Piranha 4×4 IB was designed as a light rapid reconnaissance and attack vehicle. It could take part in amphibious operations thanks to twin propellers and could operate in NBC-contaminated areas. The Piranha 4×4 was also designed to meet police needs. The MOWAG Grenadier and Mowag Spy sub-versions were also developed. The prototype of the Piranha 4×4 IB went through numerous tests and received different equipment and different engines. Due to rapid technological development and adjustments to requirements for military vehicles, no Piranha with gasoline engine was sold. The prototype is now in the Full Military Museum.

MOWAG Piranha IB 6×6

The first Piranha prototype ever built was the 6×6 IB in 1972. It can be seen as a milestone for the Piranha series due to various technical innovation like (at the time) modern designed drive with independent suspension, compact power unit in the right front and (as an amphibian drive) being powered by two propellers. This prototype was demonstrated with different engines and features for potential customers such as the Canadian Army who locally produced them as the AVGP. Switzerland sold a license to manufacture this machine to Chile in 1983. In the Swiss Army, the Piranha 6×6 is used as an ambulance, C3 command vehicle and, together with the BGM-71 TOW, as a Tank Destroyer. The prototype is along with an ambulance Piranha 6×6 on display in the Full Military Museum.

MOWAG Piranha IIIC 10×10

With the continuous evolution of the Piranha family due to increasing demands, and the projected development of the Mowag Shark as a heavy weapons carrier, the Piranha design reached the limit of its payload capacity. The Piranha 10×10 (built in 1994), was an attempt to expand the payload, using a 5th axle of the same type as used in the smaller Piranha models. The Piranha 10×10 was designed as a heavy weapons carrier, but only a small number were built for Sweden as the LIRKA command tank and Kapris radar carrier. The Piranha IIIC 10×10 marked an important development from the Piranha IIIC 8×8. The Piranha IIIC 10×10 prototype was used in various tests, including in Sweden, and now stands in the Schweizerisches Militärmuseum Full.

Family tree

 Piranha I
 AVGP
 Piranha II
 LAV II
 LAV-25
Bison and Coyote
 ASLAV
 Desert Piranha
 Piranha III
 Piranha IIIH
 LAV III
 Stryker
 NZLAV
 LAV 6
 LAV-700
 Piranha IIIC
 Piranha IV
 Piranha V

Operators

Piranha I
  Chilean army – 250 Piraña I 6×6 and 25 Piraña I 8×8.
  Ghana Army – 63 Piranha I 4×4,6×6 and 8×8.
  Nigerian Army – 110 delivered in the 1980s
  Boko Haram - at least 2, captured from the Nigerian army
  Swiss Army – 310 Piranha TOW, including 40 transformed into ambulance (Armament Program 2005, delivered in 2006–2007) and 160 converted in command vhc with M153 Protector (Armament Program 2006, delivered in 2008–2010)

Piranha II
  Royal Army of Oman – 174 Piranha II in 7 versions.
  Qatar Armed Forces – 40 Piranha II 8×8 built under licence by former British firm Alvis PLC. (36 CCTS-90 tank hunter with a Belgian Cockerill 90 mm gun and 4 ARVs-recovery). Used during the Saudi Arabian-led intervention in Yemen.
  Saudi Arabian National Guard – 1,117 LAV/Piranha II in 10 versions; another 132 ordered.
  Swedish Army – 44 Piranha II 10×10 including 27 Armoured Sensor Vehicle and 17 Armoured Command Vehicle (7.62 mm machine gun) and 10 Piranha II 8×8 Armoured Escort Vehicle ordered in 1997
  Swiss Army – over 500 Piranha IIC (APC93 8×8), including command version (Kdo Pz 93+)
  Geneva Cantonal police – 1 Piranha IIC used by the tactical unit, BI (Brigade d'Intervention)

Piranha III
  Belgian Army – 138 Piranha IIIC 8×8 in 7 versions, introduced in 2008: 64 Piranha FUSELIER (APC), 19 Piranha DF30, 18 Piranha DF90, 14 command vehicles, 6 Ambulances, 9 ARV and 8 Piranha Genie
  Botswana Defence Force – 45 Piranha IIIC.
  Brazilian Marine Corps – 30 Piranha IIIC in 3 versions.
  Danish Army – 22 Piranha IIIH, 19 Piranha IIIH to be delivered to Moldovan Army via Germany as military aid and 115 Piranha IIIC; all fitted with the Lemur 12.7mm OHW.
  Moldovan Ground Forces – 19 Piranha IIIH, supplied by Germany as overhauled former Danish Army vehicles, first 3 vehicles delivered on 11.01.2023
  Irish Army – 91 Piranha IIIH in 6 versions.
  Romanian Land Forces – 43 Piranha IIIC.
  Spanish Navy Marines – 39 Piranha IIIC in 3 versions.
  Swedish Army – 33 Piranha IIIC.
  Swiss Army – 60 Piranha IIIC, including 12 NBC detection vehicles (vhc expl ABC / ABC Aufkl Fz).

Piranha V
  Danish Army – In the process of acquiring 309 units. The first were delivered in May 2017, with all expected to be in use by 2023.
  Monégasque Carabiniers – Two Piranha V units.
  Romanian Land Forces – The first batch of 36 vehicles, produced at GDELS-Mowag's facilities in Kreuzlingen, Switzerland, they entered the endowment of the Romanian Land Forces in October 2020 at the 26th Infantry Battalion, also known as the Red Scorpions, based in Craiova, Romania. Another 191 units will be produced in Romania, at Bucharest Mechanical Factory.
  Spanish Army – Five units were acquired in 2015 as prototypes for the VBMR program.
  Spanish Navy Marines – An undetermined number of Piranha V with 120 mm guns will replace the M60A3 in service.

Former operators
  Canadian Army – 491 AVGP.
  Armed Forces of Liberia – 10 Piranha I 4×4. Saw service during the Second Liberian Civil War.
  Sierra Leone Army – about 10 Piranha I 6×6 (Non operational)

See also

Comparable vehicles

 Stryker
 LAV III/LAV AFV/LAV-25/ASLAV
 K808 Armored Personnel Carrier
 Tusan AFV
 Boxer
 Freccia IFV
 BTR-90
 CM-32
 Type 96 Armored Personnel Carrier
 Type 16 maneuver combat vehicle
 Patria AMV
 BTR-4
 Saur 2
 VBCI
 KTO Rosomak
 FNSS Pars

Notes and references

Notes

Bibliography
 Foss, Christopher F. Jane's Armour and Artillery 1987–88. London: Jane's Yearbooks, 1987. .
 Marcus Bauer, Nutzfahrzeuge der MOWAG Motorwagenfabrik AG, Fachpresse Goldach, Hudson & Company, 1996 
 Military Museum Full
 Ruedi Baumann: "Alles" was MOWAG schon bewegt hat – Auf Umwegen zum Welterfolg. SwissMoto. Bildpress Zuerich BPZ

External links

 General Dynamics European Land Systems product page for Piranha 3
 General Dynamics European Land Systems product page for Piranha 5
 Swissmotor.ch – Neue Radpanzergeneration bei MOWAG – Der PIRANHA III
 Soldf.com – Piranha III 10×Armoured Sensor Vehicle
 DanskPanser.dk – Danish Piranha IIIC
 DanskPanser.dk – Danish Piranha IIIH
 War Wheels – Canadian Bison
 Military Today – Canadian Bison

Wheeled armoured fighting vehicles
Military vehicles introduced in the 1970s
Armoured fighting vehicles of Switzerland
Mowag Piranha
Wheeled amphibious armoured fighting vehicles
Armoured personnel carriers of the Cold War